Islamic Community of Yugoslavia was an organisation of Muslims in the socialist Yugoslavia established in 1947. The organisation was seated in Sarajevo, where reis-ul-ulema resided together with the Rijaset, the most senior body of the organisation.

The Supreme Assembly of the Islamic Community of Yugoslavia was made of members of the republican assemblies from all of the socialist republics, with those from Bosnia and Herzegovina, Croatia, and Slovenia being seated in Sarajevo, the Serbian delegates in Pristina, the Montenegrin delegates in Titograd and the Macedonian delegates in Skopje. Each of these republican assemblies also had its rijaset.

In 1990, the Islamic Community of Yugoslavia adopted the new constitution, according to which Zagreb became a center for the republican assemblies of Croatia and Slovenia, while the republican assembly in Sarajevo represented Bosnia and Herzegovina only. The status of other republican assemblies remained the same. With the new constitution, the republican assemblies were renamed to mešihat. On 9 March 1991, the Islamic Community of Yugoslavia gained the first democratically elected reis-ul-ulema, a Macedonian Jakub Selimoski.

With the dissolution of Yugoslavia and the international recognition of newly independent countries, several independent Islamic communities were established. The Islamic Community of Yugoslavia adopted another Constitution in Skopje on 5 February 1993, recognising the independence of separated communities. At the time when Bosnia and Herzegovina, Macedonia, and Montenegro have established their own Islamic communities. The mešihat of Serbia with a seat in Priština, was renamed as the Islamic Community of Kosovo. The meeting of the representatives of the newly formed mešihats in Istanbul at the end of October 1997, was a formal end of the Islamic Community of Yugoslavia.

Reis-ul-ulema 

1947–1957 Ibrahim Fejić (1879–1962)
1957–1975 Sulejman Kemura (1908–1975)
1975–1987 Naim Hadžiabdić (1918–1987)
1987 Ferhat Šeta, acting
1987–1989 Husein Mujić (1918–1994) 
1990–1991 Jakub Selimoski (1946–2013), acting
1991–1993 Jakub Selimoski (1946–2013)

Footnotes

References

Books

Journals 

 

1947 establishments in Yugoslavia
Islamic organizations established in 1947
Islam in Yugoslavia